Koukkos is a village and a community of the Katerini municipality. Before the 2011 local government reform it was part of the municipality of Korinos, of which it was a municipal district. The 2011 census recorded 335 inhabitants in the village.

See also
Korinos
List of settlements in the Pieria regional unit

References

Populated places in Pieria (regional unit)